Aleksandr Pavlov is a former international speedway rider from the Soviet Union.

Speedway career 
Pavlov reached the final of the Speedway World Championship in the 1972 Individual Speedway World Championship and the 1973 Individual Speedway World Championship. He was one of six Russians that competed in the 1972 World final after strong performances in the Continental final and European final.

World final appearances

Individual World Championship
 1972 –  London, Wembley Stadium – 6th – 8pts
 1973 –  Chorzów, Silesian Stadium – 13th – 4 pts

References 

Russian speedway riders
Living people
Year of birth missing (living people)